David Wilson (May 25, 1858 – December 6, 1927) was an Irish-born rancher, financial agent and political figure in Manitoba. He represented Gladstone from 1903 to 1907 in the Legislative Assembly of Manitoba as a Conservative.

Background
Born in Limerick, the son of Reverend David Wilson, Wilson was educated at Switzers and Weir's College and was a member of the Corn Exchange in London from 1879 to 1883. In 1883, Wilson moved to Manitoba and ranched until 1902, also serving as reeve for the Rural Municipality of Lansdowne.

Wilson married Emily Bates in 1891. He was defeated when he ran for reelection to the Manitoba assembly in 1907.

Last Years
After becoming a partner in an investment firm in Winnipeg around 1906, Wilson retired in 1922 due to poor health and subsequently returned to Ireland. He died there at the age of 69.

References 

1858 births
1927 deaths
Progressive Conservative Party of Manitoba MLAs
Irish emigrants to Canada (before 1923)